Shri Mahadev, also known as Shri, is an Indian film actor, who has worked predominantly in Kannada film industry. Shri is best known for his breakthrough performance of Aakash in Iruvudellava Bittu.

Filmography

Films

Short films

Television

References

External links
 
 

Living people
1990 births
Indian actors